Charles Fortescue may refer to:

 Charles Granville Fortescue (1861–1951), British Army officer
 Charles Legeyt Fortescue (1876–1936), electrical engineer